The Grote Prijs Raymond Impanis was a one-day road cycling race held annually in Belgium from 1982 until 1994. The race took place between Kampenhout and Sint-Niklaas in the Flemish Region of Belgium.

Winners

References 

Cycle races in Belgium
Recurring sporting events established in 1982
Recurring sporting events disestablished in 1994
1982 establishments in Belgium
1994 disestablishments in Belgium
Defunct cycling races in Belgium